Leyden Township is one of 29 townships in Cook County, Illinois, USA.  As of the 2010 census, its population was 92,890.

Geography
Leyden Township is located just northwest of the city of Chicago, an edge of which (a stretch of land connecting O'Hare International Airport to the main body of the city) lies within the township but as a separate entity.

Cities, towns, villages
 Bensenville (east of Mt. Prospect Rd.)
 Chicago (part of Schiller Woods)
 Elmwood Park
 Franklin Park
 Melrose Park (north of North Av.)
 Norridge (west edge)
 Northlake (north of North Av.)
 Park Ridge (south edge)
 River Grove
 Rosemont (southeast three-quarters)
 Schiller Park

Adjacent townships
 Maine Township (north)
 Norwood Park Township (northeast)
 Oak Park Township (southeast)
 River Forest Township (southeast)
 Proviso Township (south)
 York Township, DuPage County (southwest)
 Addison Township, DuPage County (west)

Education
Leyden Township is home to Leyden High School District 212 which operates East and West Leyden High Schools and Elmwood Park Community Unit School District 401. 16 public elementary schools operate within the township. 

Leyden also contains Triton Community College located in River Grove.

Cemeteries
The township contains these five cemeteries: Eden Memorial Park, Elmwood, Fairview Memorial, Memorial Estates and Saint Joseph.

Major highways
  Interstate 90
  Interstate 190
  Interstate 294
  U.S. Route 12
  U.S. Route 45
  Illinois Route 19
  Illinois Route 64
  Illinois Route 171

Landmarks
 O'Hare International Airport
 Cook County Forest Preserve (south quarter)

Demographics

Political districts
 Illinois's 4th congressional district
 State House District 65
 State House District 77
 State Senate District 33
 State Senate District 39

References
 
 United States Census Bureau 2007 TIGER/Line Shapefiles
 United States National Atlas

External links
 Leyden Township official website
 City-Data.com
 Illinois State Archives
 Township Officials of Illinois
 Cool County official site

Townships in Cook County, Illinois
Townships in Illinois